Westend is a locality of the Berlin borough Charlottenburg-Wilmersdorf in Germany. It emerged in the course of Berlin's 2001 administrative reform on the grounds of the former Charlottenburg borough. Originally a mansion colony, it is today a quite densely settled, still affluent territory adjacent to Berlin's inner city in the east.

Geography
Westend is situated west of Berlin's inner city on Spandauer Berg, the northern peak of the sandy Teltow plateau between the river valleys of Spree and Havel. It is centered on Theodor-Heuss-Platz, a large square, from where the Heerstraße arterial road, part of the Bundesstraße 2 and Bundesstraße 5 highways, runs west towards the Berlin city limits. In the west and north, Westend borders on the Berlin Spandau borough.

The locality also includes the neighbourhoods of Neu-Westend and Ruhleben, a suburban housing area of the 1920s. The site of the former Ruhleben internment camp, a World War I detention camp for civilians, today is part of the adjacent Spandau district. Furthermore, the areas of Pichelsberg, Heerstraße and Eichkamp at the northern rim of the Grunewald forest belong to Westend. It is also home of the Messe Berlin exhibition grounds (where the International Green Week and the Internationale Funkausstellung are held) and of the Olympiastadion built for the 1936 Summer Olympics.

History

When upon the 1806 Battle of Jena–Auerstedt victorious Napoleon moved into Berlin, he had a military camp set up on Spandauer Berg, though he himself chose nearby Charlottenburg Palace for accommodation. In May 1808 General Claude Victor-Perrin, French governor of Berlin, pitched the large Camp Napoleonbourg here, however, he folded up his tents already in November and wasteland was left behind. On the road from Charlottenburg to Spandau, the Spandauer Bock brewery was established in 1840, together with a popular pub catering though of doubtful reputation.

The Villenkolonie Westend was developed from 1866 on as a residential area for the wealthy bourgeoisie of Berlin and named after the West End of London. The beginnings, overshadowed by the Austro-Prussian War, were quite modest and the first land settlement company around the Stettin merchant Johannes Quistorp and architect Martin Gropius collapsed in the Panic of 1873. Nevertheless, the development was boosted by Berlin's population pressure after the unification of Germany and similar to other mansion colonies such as Lichterfelde West or Grunewald, most of the premises were overbuilt by the end of the century.

The area was connected to the Berlin Ringbahn with the inauguration of Westend station in 1877.
In 1889 a harness racing track opened, which was relocated to Ruhleben in 1908. Westend again became a garrison town, when in the 1890s the 3rd Brigade regiment No. 3 (Königin Elisabeth) barracks of the German 2nd Guards Infantry Division were erected on the eastern Spandauer Berg slope. On 8 June 1913, the Deutsches Stadion was inaugurated in the northern Grunewald forest, designated as venue of the 1916 Summer Olympics that were never held due to World War I and later rebuilt as Olympiastation.

Sights

 Funkturm, erected in 1926 on the Messe Berlin grounds
 Haus des Rundfunks by Hans Poelzig, 1931, today broadcasting centre of the Rundfunk Berlin-Brandenburg (RBB)
 Deutschlandhalle arena, 1935, demolished in 2011
 Messe Berlin arena, 1936/1937
 St. George's Anglican Church, 1950
 Epiphany Church, built in 1906 according to plans designed by Jürgen Kröger
 Olympic Stadium with Bell Tower (Glockenturm) and Waldbühne amphitheatre by Werner March, 1934–36
 Unité d'Habitation with Modulor scale by Le Corbusier, part of the Interbau exhibition 1957
 Studio of sculptor Georg Kolbe, 1928/1929, today a museum
 Internationales Congress Centrum (ICC) conference centre, 1975–1979
 Mommsen Stadium, 1930, home of the Tennis Borussia Berlin football club
 Westend hospital of the German Red Cross
 Spandauer Berg water tower, 1909
 Villas along the street Am Rupenhorn by Erich Mendelsohn, 1930 and Wassili and Hans Luckhardt, 1932
 Kaiser Wilhelm Memorial Cemetery

Transportation
Westend is served by the Berlin S-Bahn Ringbahn lines S41, S42 and S46 at the stations Westend, Messe Nord/ICC and Westkreuz as well as the Westbahn lines S75 and S5 at the stations Messe Süd, Heerstraße, Olympiastadion (Süd) and Pichelsberg. The Siemensstadt-Fürstenbrunn station is abandoned since 1980.

U-Bahn connection to the inner city is provided by the U2 line with the stations Kaiserdamm, Theodor-Heuss-Platz, Neu-Westend, Olympia-Stadion (Ost) and Ruhleben.

The A100 (Berliner Stadtring) motorway marks Westend's eastern border. The federal highways Bundesstraße 2 and Bundesstraße 5 together run through the locality along the streets Kaiserdamm and Heerstraße. Near the S-Bahn station Messe Nord/ICC is Berlin's Central Bus station Zentraler Omnibusbahnhof (ZOB).

See also

St. George's Anglican Church, Berlin
Touro College Berlin

References

External links

Localities of Berlin

1866 establishments in Prussia